Eliza Wheeler (born December 21, 1982) is an American author-illustrator of Miss Maple Seeds (Penguin), which debuted on the New York Times Bestseller list and has sold more than a million copies. She is also the illustrator of Holly Black's 2014 Newbery Medal Honor Book Doll Bones (McElderry Books), Alison McGhee's 'Tell Me A Tattoo Story', Pat Zietlow-Miller's 'Wherever You Go', and Mara Rockliff's The Grudge Keeper (Peachtree). She lives in Los Angeles, California. She is a 2006 graduate of the University of Wisconsin–Stout with a BFA in Graphic Design.

Works List
Writer and illustrator
Miss Maple's Seeds (Nancy Paulsen, Apr 2013), 

Illustrator
The Left-Handed Fate, by Kate Milford, (Aug 2016), 
Cody and the Fountain of Happiness, by Tricia Springstubb (Candlewick, Apr 2015), 
Wherever You Go, by Pat Zietlow Miller (Little, Brown, Apr 2015), 
The Incorrigible Children of Ashton Place series by Maryrose Wood (Balzer + Bray)
Book I: The Mysterious Howling paperback reprint edition (Apr 2015), 
Book II: The Hidden Gallery paperback reprint edition (Apr 2015), 
Book III: The Unseen Guest paperback reprint edition (Apr 2015), 
Book IV: The Interrupted Tale paperback reprint edition (Apr 2015), 
Book V: The Unmapped Sea (Apr 2015), 
Spirit's Key, by Edith Cohn (Farrar, Straus and Giroux, Sep 2014), 
The Grudge Keeper, by Mara Rockliff (Peachtree, Apr 2014), 
The Desperate Adventures of Zeno and Alya, by Jane Kelley (Feiwel & Friends, Oct 2013), 
Doll Bones, by Holly Black (Margaret K. McElderry, May 2013), 
What Does It Mean to be Present?, by Rana DiOrio (Little Pickle, Jul 2010),

See also

Children's literature
Picture books
Illustration

References

Living people
Writers from Minnesota
People from Wisconsin
American children's writers
American women children's writers
21st-century American women writers
American children's book illustrators
American women illustrators
Writers who illustrated their own writing
1982 births